ACDM may refer to:

 Airport Collaborative Decision Making, a standardized method for managing airport operations
 ASEAN Committee on Disaster Management (cf. Organisations associated with the Association of Southeast Asian Nations)

Other languages
 Associação Cultural e Desportiva de Mindelo, a sports association

See also
ΛCDM, Lambda-CDM model